Worms: Battle Islands is an artillery turn-based tactics developed by Team17 and part of the Worms series. It was released for the PlayStation Portable and Wii.

Gameplay
Like previous Worms games, Worms: Battle Islands is a turn-based strategy/tactics game, in which the player takes turns controlling worms, and firing weapons on destructible terrain.

Reception

The game received "mixed or average reviews" on both platforms according to the review aggregation website Metacritic.

References

External links
Official Worms: Battle Islands website

2010 video games
Artillery video games
PlayStation Portable games
Sony Interactive Entertainment games
Strategy video games
THQ games
Video games developed in the United Kingdom
Video games set on fictional islands
Wii games
Worms games